Abby Whiteside (Aug 27, 1881 Vermillion, South Dakota – Dec 10, 1956 Menlo Park, California) was an American piano teacher. She challenged the finger-centric approach of much classical piano teaching and instead advocated a holistic attitude in which the arm and torso are the conductors of a musical image conceived first in the mind.

Life
Whiteside majored in music at the University of South Dakota. After a period spent teaching at the University of Oregon, she studied in Germany with Rudolf Ganz. On returning to the United States and teaching first in Oregon and then New York City, she slowly developed the ideas for which she became known.

Ideas

The catalyst for the development of Whiteside's philosophy was the realisation that, as she wrote,
"...the pupils in my studio played or didn't play, and that was that. The talented ones progressed, the others didn't--and I could do nothing about it."

Whiteside praised the natural ability of the child prodigy and the jazz pianist, and sought to understand how an untutored technique could be capable of virtuosity. One of her teaching principles stemming from that view was that piano pieces must be assimilated not so much as muscle memory, but as an intrinsic memory of musical content.

One of her pedagogical devices to achieve this was to practice works in different keys, or cross-handed, even simultaneously cross-handed in different keys. Then, upon returning to the correct key, hand positions, and tempo, many of the previous problems in technique had been overcome. Another important device—used especially in the correct tempo of the piece, no matter how fast—is what she calls "outlining": skipping notes provided that the basic rhythm and body dynamics of motion were maintained. (Her term "basic rhythm" is explored below.) The pianist uses these techniques to establish the musical content as firmly in the mind as possible, replacing note-to-note technical concentration—and the attendant note-to-note musical attention—with accomplishment of the larger musical phrase.

In "Indispensables of Piano Playing" Whiteside describes a fulcrum system that a pianist uses for effective playing. She states that the finger is the fulcrum of the wrist, the wrist the fulcrum of the forearm, the forearm the fulcrum of the upper arm, the upper arm the fulcrum of the shoulder, and the shoulder the fulcrum of the upper body. Whiteside believed all these parts needed to act as one in order to produce good sound and the soul was the chief operator of this system.
 
In her view, fingers are almost useless as agents of either direction or force. Although they might be tutored with much patience to achieve a certain level of dexterity, they possess only limited strength and movement. Indeed, the fourth finger in particular possesses very little of either. Instead, Whiteside advocated the use of the humerus as the principal force for producing a tone at the piano—the shoulder joint, being simultaneously powerful and subtle, is more than capable of doing all the work of any individual finger, and moreover is capable of maneuvering any finger into the optimum position such that a simple downward arm movement is required to sound a note. Thus "weak" fingers (i.e., the fourth finger) are not weak if they are driven by the force of the arm, and exercises to develop their "strength" are a waste of time.

More than even the arm, however, Whiteside advocated the concept of a basic rhythm—a somewhat specialized term in her writings which indicated an innate sense of phrasing present in all but the most unmusical humans. This rhythm informs every action involved in producing a musical phrase, with the torso, humerus, forearm, wrist and fingers forming a single mechanism to express it. Thus, trying to create a completely independent finger technique is inhibitive to the unified expression of a musical phrase and only encourages what she called "note-wise procedure"—conceiving music as a sequence of unconnected pitches rather than as a whole.

Whiteside considered the Chopin Études to be the exact point at which a finger-based technique broke down—only a technique which used the arm to direct the phrases conceived in the brain could even approach them. She was utterly dismissive of the exercises of Czerny and Hanon, writing:

"Hanon is used for developing independent fingers with equal hitting power. Obviously this cannot be accomplished. Each finger may gain more power, but there will still be inequality in the fingers. Fingers need to be only expert in transmitting the power of the arm."

Whiteside's sense of muscular use is partly along the lines of the Alexander technique; perhaps the best-known and best-formalized modern school was founded by Dorothy Taubman. (Taubman's method is now being carried forward by the Golandsky Institute.)

Criticism

In spite of the remarkable results Whiteside achieved with her own pupils (many of whom were far from promising when beginning lessons with her), a technique based on independence of the fingers continues to be widely taught; although the notion is now widespread that an effective arm technique is essential to fluent playing and avoiding repetitive strain injury, few teachers have been willing to entirely abandon the concept of finger drilling.

Critics have pointed out that only one of Whiteside's pupils, Robert Helps, became known as a concert virtuoso. The same charge could be levelled at an influential contemporary in England, Tobias Matthay, whose only single noted pupil was Myra Hess (actually not true, there were plenty more, like Moura Lympani amongst others). Where some  argue that her case is not helped by the inadequacies of her prose style (it has been described as convoluted, unclear, repetitious and poorly structured), a comparison with Matthay reveals that her books are far superior in clarity of prose - she was in any case first and foremost a teacher rather than a writer. The fact that she taught privately would have reduced her chances of having 'concert pianist material' students, since they would almost always prefer to study at a conservatoire. Many great pianists and pedagogues had few if any famous pupils, from Chopin to Dinu Lipatti - they were offering training in authentic pianism, which is often somewhat at odds against the superficial acrobatics of the contemporary concert scene.

Favourable testimonials from adult learners who have read her books are widespread. A recurring theme is that the very same Chopin Études on which she based so much of her teaching had been a stumbling-block until her methods were applied. (It might also have some relevance that Chopin himself is reported to have opposed this idea of equalizing the fingers, which was beginning to catch on in his time.)

Legacy
In addition to Robert Helps, two of Whiteside's pupils became noted teachers in their own right: Joseph Prostakoff, who taught the noted jazz pianist and educator Barry Harris, and Sophia Rosoff, who taught Harris as well as jazz pianists Fred Hersch and Ethan Iverson. Whiteside also tutored two American composers: Morton Gould and Vivian Fine.  Miss Frankye A. Dixon another prominent pupil of Abbey Whiteside, who taught music at Howard University, in Washington, DC.  She is the daughter of famed composer and musician the late Will H. Dixon, dubbed "The Original Dancing Conductor" by James Weldon Johnson, circa 1930.

In the late 1950s, Rosoff set up the Abby Whiteside Foundation, dedicated to promote her ideas, train teachers and performers and organize recitals by pianists trained in Whiteside's methods.

Works
 Whiteside, Abby, 2003. Abby Whiteside on Piano Playing: Indispensables of Piano Playing, Mastering the Chopin Etudes and Other Essays. Joseph Prostakoff, Sophia Rosoff, eds. Amadeus Press, Portland. [Indispensables orig. pub. posthumously, 1955; Mastering orig. pub. posthumously, 1969]. .

References

External links
 The Abby Whiteside Foundation
 The Golandsky Institute
 

1881 births
1956 deaths
People from Vermillion, South Dakota
American music educators
University of South Dakota alumni
University of Oregon faculty